"Anema e core" may refer to:

Anema e core (film), or My Heart Sings, a 1951 Italian comedy film
"Anema e core" (song), a popular song